Grévillers is a commune in the Pas-de-Calais department in the Hauts-de-France region of France.

Geography

Population

Places of interest
 The church of Notre-Dame, dating from the seventeenth century.
 The Commonwealth War Graves Commission cemetery.
 Memorial to General Aubert Frere, born here in 1881.

See also
Communes of the Pas-de-Calais department

References

External links

 The CWGC cemetery at Grévillers
 South Africans buried in Grevillers British Cemetery
 The memorial to Gen. Frere 

Communes of Pas-de-Calais